Colin Brinded (1946 – 26 November 2005) was an English snooker referee from 1976 until his death.

Brinded began officiating at major professional events in 1976. Two occasions on which he officiated during key matches were the World Championship finals between Stephen Hendry and Mark Williams in 1999 and the match between Peter Ebdon and Ronnie O'Sullivan in 2005 (the so-called "slow-play" match).

Brinded died after a long battle with cancer. In BBC2's coverage of the UK Championship on 9 December 2005, tributes came from fellow referee Eirian Williams; veteran commentator and journalist Clive Everton; and from players John Parrott, Stephen Hendry and then-reigning World Champion Shaun Murphy.

References

Snooker referees and officials
1946 births
2005 deaths
Deaths from cancer in England
English referees and umpires